Watcher is a 2022 psychological thriller film written and directed by Chloe Okuno in her feature film directorial and screenwriting debut, based on an original screenplay by Zack Ford. The film stars Maika Monroe, Karl Glusman, and Burn Gorman.

Watcher had its world premiere at the Sundance Film Festival on January 22, 2022, and was released in the United States on June 3, 2022, by IFC Midnight and Shudder.

Plot
American couple Julia and Francis relocate to Bucharest, moving into an apartment building with a large picture window. Julia notices a man looming in a window from the building across the street. While Francis works long hours, Julia grows unnerved by the man in the window, who watches her on a daily basis.

Julia's fear heightens when she learns of a serial killer, dubbed "the Spider" by local media, who is decapitating young women. While walking through the city one day, she senses a man is following her. She manages to flee from a nearby market but when Francis and Julia visit the market to review the security footage, it proves inconclusive.

Julia befriends her neighbor, Irina. Irina shows Julia a pistol her boyfriend Cristian gave her for protection. Later that night, Julia waves at the man in the window, and he waves back. Convinced that it is the same man who followed her, she calls the police. Francis accompanies an officer to the adjacent building to speak with the man, whom they learn is named Daniel Weber.

One day, Julia follows Daniel to a strip club, where he works as a janitor. Irina, a dancer at the club, spots her. Julia questions Irina about Daniel, but she knows nothing. That night, Julia hears a commotion in Irina's apartment. Julia convinces the landlady to unlock the apartment, but they find no sign of Irina. Francis believes Julia's fears are imagined, and points to the fact that "the Spider" has apparently been apprehended.

The next day, Cristian arrives searching for Irina, who never returned home. They try to confront Daniel in his apartment but no one answers the door. Julia works up the nerve to knock by herself later, but it is answered by an elderly man. That night, a police officer arrives at their apartment accompanied by Daniel, who accuses Julia of stalking him. The officer chalks the incident up to a misunderstanding.

Julia accompanies Francis to a company party, and gleans that he has made jokes about her fears to his coworkers. She angrily leaves and boards the subway, where she notices Daniel in the near-empty car. When he attempts to explain his voyeurism of her—that he lives an isolated, unexciting life caring for his father—Julia notices what appears to be the outline of a severed head in his shopping bag. She returns home, where she begins packing. She is interrupted by music playing in Irina's apartment. Inside, she finds Irina's headless corpse, before Daniel smothers her with a plastic bag.

When Julia regains consciousness, Daniel recounts how he killed Irina and hid with her body when Julia and the landlady entered the apartment. Julia hears Francis enter their apartment next-door, but when she attempts to scream, Daniel slashes her throat. Francis calls Julia's cell phone, which he hears ringing inside Irina's apartment. He sees Daniel exiting and begins to walk toward Daniel, but Julia suddenly shoots Daniel multiple times with Irina's pistol, killing him. She steps out of Irina's apartment, covered in blood, and stares at Francis.

Cast
 Maika Monroe as Julia
 Karl Glusman as Francis
 Burn Gorman as Daniel Weber
 Tudor Petruț as taxi driver
 Mădălina Anea as Irina
 Cristina Deleanu as Eleanora
 Daniel Nuță as Cristian

Production
In March 2021, it was announced that Maika Monroe, Karl Glusman and Burn Gorman would star in a film titled Watcher for Image Nation Abu Dhabi and Spooky Pictures.

Principal photography began on March 8, 2021, and concluded on April 16, 2021, in Bucharest, Romania. The film took approximately six weeks to make in total.

Release
It premiered at the 2022 Sundance Film Festival on January 22, 2022. Later, IFC Midnight and Shudder acquired the North American distribution rights to the film. Shortly after, AGC International sold worldwide rights outside North America to Focus Features. It was released in the United States on June 3, 2022. 

The film was released by IFC Films on Blu-ray in North America on October 4, 2022.

Reception

Box office
In the United States and Canada, the film earned $826,775 from 764 theaters in its opening weekend. It made $335,376 (a drop of 59%) in its second weekend; $87,155 (–74%) in its third; $21,843 (–74.9%) in its fourth; and $7,386 (–66.2%) in its fifth.

Critical response
 

Lena Wilson of The New York Times called it "one of this century's most arresting tales of female anxiety."

References

External links
 

2022 directorial debut films
2022 independent films
2022 multilingual films
2022 psychological thriller films
2020s American films
2020s English-language films
2020s Romanian-language films
2020s serial killer films
American independent films
American psychological thriller films
American serial killer films
Emirati multilingual films
Emirati thriller films
English-language Emirati films
English-language Romanian films
Films about security and surveillance
Films about stalking
Films impacted by the COVID-19 pandemic
Films set in apartment buildings
Films set in Bucharest
Films shot in Bucharest
Focus Features films
IFC Films films
Romanian independent films
Romanian multilingual films
Romanian thriller films
Universal Pictures films